"On to the Next One" is a song by American rapper Jay-Z, released as the fourth single from his eleventh studio album The Blueprint 3 on his Roc Nation label, also released as the fourth single in the United Kingdom after "Young Forever". It was released on December 15, 2009. The song features additional rap vocals and music production from producer and rapper Swizz Beatz. The song contains a vocal sample of the words "under the spotlight" as well as a background synthesizer sound from the live version of Justice's song "D.A.N.C.E.".

The song won the Grammy Award for Best Rap Performance by a Duo or Group at the 53rd Grammy Awards, making this, in total Jay-Z's 13th Grammy Award overall, and Swizz Beatz's first Grammy Award win. In addition, Jay-Z is the first artist to have all four singles from one album win six Grammy Awards in their respective category. The song has been frequently used for freestyles, notably by Ab-Soul, Bun B, Crooked I and Red Cafe. This song was also part of the soundtrack of NBA 2K13, which was selected by Jay-Z, and has been used as part of Peloton's television commercials promoting their interactive spinning cycle.

Promotion
The song was first performed at Jay-Z's Answer the Call benefit concert in Madison Square Garden on September 11, 2009. It was also performed in the UK on Friday Night with Jonathan Ross on February 19, 2010.

Critical reception
Devin Chanda from Billboard magazine gave the song a positive review:
"More than any of its predecessors, 'On to the Next One' best accomplishes what Jay-Z set out to do with 'The Blueprint 3': stay the course of trendsetter."

Music video
The music video was directed by Sam Brown and was filmed in November 2009. The video premiered on January 1, 2010 on New Year's Eve with Carson Daly.  Although it was uploaded on YouTube on December 31, 2009, it has been called the first music video of the decade, though its New Year's Eve upload date contradicts that title.

The video is highly surreal. It is shot in black-and-white, and at a 4:3 aspect ratio. The people, symbols, and characters in the video seem to be wearing black and white colors to coincide with the video. There are split second scenes while there are somewhat of an abundance of biblical references in it. Throughout the video, there are crucifixes, angelic symbols, a skull reminiscent of Damien Hirst's famous sculpture For the Love of God and often Baphomet. During part of the music video, the music stops, and the audience sees producer Swizz Beatz with his back to them as he seemingly makes the symbol with his coat by raising his hands. Jay-Z appears wearing a leather jacket and sunglasses. There is a cameo appearance by Colin Bailey, better known as Drums of Death, who is known for his skull face paint. In the video, Bailey appears to be perplexed, confused, and/or mad. At approximately three minutes and thirty nine seconds into the video, there are two bullets on either side of a crucifix. Rapper Young Jeezy  also makes a cameo in the video.

Charts

Weekly charts

Year-end charts

References

2009 singles
Jay-Z songs
Swizz Beatz songs
Song recordings produced by Swizz Beatz
Songs written by Swizz Beatz
Songs written by Jay-Z
Roc Nation singles
Atlantic Records singles
Black-and-white music videos
2009 songs